The 2021 Genesis was a professional wrestling event produced by Impact Wrestling and the 12th edition in the Genesis chronology. It took place on January 9, 2021, at Skyway Studios in Nashville, Tennessee and aired exclusively on Impact Plus.

Nine matches were contested at the event. In the main event, Willie Mack defeated Moose in an "I Quit" Match. In other prominent matches, Jordynne Grace defeated Jazz and Ace Austin defeated Blake Christian to win the 2021 Super X Cup Tournament.

Production

Background
In 2013, Impact Wrestling (then known as Total Nonstop Action Wrestling) discontinued monthly pay-per-view events in favor of the pre-recorded One Night Only events. Genesis was produced as a PPV from 2005 to 2013, but in 2014, Genesis was televised as an Impact Wrestling television special until 2018. On December 12, 2020, it was revived as a monthly special for Impact Plus, with that year's event taking place on December 12 at Skyway Studios in Nashville, Tennessee.

Storylines
The event featured professional wrestling matches that involve different wrestlers from pre-existing scripted feuds and storylines. Wrestlers portrayed villains, heroes, or less distinguishable characters in scripted events that build tension and culminate in a wrestling match or series of matches.

A main feature of the show was the 2021 Super X Cup tournament, which has been sporadically held in Impact Wrestling since the company's formation in 2002. The winner will receive the Super X Cup trophy, and winning the Super X Cup has historically been portrayed as a stepping stone to becoming a top contender for the Impact Wrestling X Division Championship. On the December 21 episode of Impact, the brackets were revealed. Competitors included Impact stars (Ace Austin, Cousin Jake, Crazzy Steve, Daivari, and Suicide) and independent wrestlers (Blake Christian, KC Navarro, and Tre Lamar).

At Turning Point, Willie Mack defeated self-proclaimed TNA World Heavyweight Champion Moose by disqualification after Moose repeatedly landed forearm shots on an unconscious Mack after the match. The two have been in a feud that included Mack's best friend, Impact World Champion Rich Swann, who Moose called a "secondary champion". Moose would repeatedly perform the same action of the Turning Point conclusion on Mack, including a No Disqualification match the Impact after Turning Point; and a tag team match on the go-home show before Final Resolution, where Mack and Swann battled Moose and Chris Bey. On the December 15 episode of Impact, Moose, who again called out Swann, instead got Mack. Furious about a referee deciding when he was done, Mack challenged Moose to an "I quit" match so that he decides when he's done. The same night, IMPACT announced via their website that the match will happen at Genesis.

After weeks of trying to find a compatible tag team partner, Jordynne Grace revealed on the November 24 Impact her partner for the Impact Knockouts Tag Team Championship Tournament, former WWE Women's Champion and NWA World Women's Champion Jazz. This would become the start of Jazz's retirement tour going through 2021. The duo would debut as a team on December 1st, defeating Killer Kelly and Renee Michelle in the first round, but fell to Havok and Nevaeh on January 4. Backstage, Jazz and Grace would have a talk, with Grace apologizing for having Jazz postpone retirement to fall up short, but Jazz assured her she regrets nothing. Seeing as how Jazz had more to prove, Grace challenged Jazz to a match at Genesis, and Jazz accepted.

Results

2021 Super X Cup bracket

Notes

References

External links

2021 Impact Plus Monthly Special events
2021 in professional wrestling
2021 in Tennessee
Events in Nashville, Tennessee
Impact Wrestling Genesis
January 2021 events in the United States
Professional wrestling in Nashville, Tennessee